Diospage splendens, the Burnet tiger, is a moth of the subfamily Arctiinae. The species was first described by Herbert Druce in 1895. It is found in Ecuador, Peru and Bolivia.

References

Moths described in 1895
Euchromiina